The 1974 Japan Series was the 25th edition of Nippon Professional Baseball's postseason championship series. It matched the Central League champion Chunichi Dragons against the Pacific League champion Lotte Orions. This was the first Japan Series since 1964 without the Yomiuri Giants, who had won the previous nine championships. The Orions defeated the Dragons in six games to win their second title, and first since winning the inaugural Japan Series as the Mainichi Orions.

Summary

See also
1974 World Series

References

Japan Series
Chiba Lotte Marines
Chunichi Dragons
Japan Series
Japan Series
Japan Series
Japan Series